Phalewas is a municipality located in Parbat District of Gandaki Province of Nepal. The municipality was established on 10 March 2017 merging the former VDCs: Karkineta, Thapathana, Shankar Pokhari, Mudikuwa, Phalebas Khanigaun, Devisthan, Limithana, Thana Maulo, Bhangara, Kurgha and Pangrang The municipality is divided into 11 wards and the headquarter (admin centre) of the municipality declared at Phalebas Khanigaun. The municipality spans   of area, with a total population of 24,688 individuals according to a 2011 Nepal census.

Demographics
At the time of the 2011 Nepal census, Phalewas Municipality had a population of 24,729. Of these, 96.0% spoke Nepali, 1.3% Newar, 1.2% Gurung, 1.2% Magar, 0.1% Urdu and 0.2% other languages as their first language.

In terms of ethnicity/caste, 42.7% were Hill Brahmin, 26.8% Chhetri, 8.8% Kami, 7.1% Sarki, 5.0% Damai/Dholi, 4.1% Newar, 1.9% Magar, 1.4% Gurung, 0.5% Gharti/Bhujel and 1.7% others.

In terms of religion, 96.8% were Hindu, 2.6% Buddhist, 0.3% Muslim, 0.1% Christian and 0.2% others.

References

External links
official website of the rural municipality

Municipalities in Parbat District
Nepal municipalities established in 2017